Escaphiella hespera is a species of goblin spider in the family Oonopidae. It is found in the United States and Mexico.

References

Oonopidae
Articles created by Qbugbot
Spiders described in 1924